was a third-person puzzle-action video game that is published and developed by Namco Bandai Games for iOS. With rumors beginning in March 2011, the game was revealed in a pre-release state at E3 2011, and was released to the public on September 29. Katamari Amore is the second game of the Katamari franchise to be released on iOS, and features Game Center integration.

The game's plot revolves around the main character Prince retrieving specific items on the planet Earth for his father the King of All Cosmos.

Katamari Amore was removed from the Apple Store on March 30, 2015.

Story
The primary story deals with the Prince of All Cosmos adventures on Earth while carrying out missions for his father, known as the King of All Cosmos.  One day while cleaning his room, the King finds a book known as "Have a Nice Trip!", which he had gotten while visiting the planet Earth.  The book details different rare objects that can be seen around the world.  Upon discovering the book, and realizing he is smitten with the beauty of the objects, he orders Prince to Earth to roll them up and bring them back to him.

Gameplay

Much of the gameplay is the same as other games in the Katamari series, where a player controls the Prince of All Cosmos who rolls up various items across different levels with a "katamari" in order to increase size. As the katamari's size increases, it is able to roll up more items. Along the way, and depending on the game mode selected by the player, Prince's father, the King of All Cosmos dictates specific challenges that must be met.

There are multiple control scheme options available.  In the "Acceleration Sensor" scheme, the accelerometer of the gaming device is utilized, and Prince is controlled by physically tilting the device.  The "Double Virtual Pad" scheme, where dual virtual sticks are presented on-screen, is the most similar to the traditional style of controls featured in the original Katamari Damacy game.  The third control scheme, "Single Virtual Pad", which is chosen by default, is the same as the previous scheme in that it also utilizes multi-touch, but only a single virtual stick is displayed on-screen.  Regardless of the controls chosen, the option to quickly turn Prince around is achieved by tapping an on-screen button located at the bottom of the display.

Katamari Amore features several different modes of play.  In "Story Mode", the player follows the game's storyline, and must complete the King's challenges.  In "Time Attack Mode", the player simply attempts to roll as large a katamari as possible before the time available runs out.  In "Exact Size Challenge Mode", the player attempts to roll the katamari to a specified size, while "Eternal Mode" allows the player to freely roam the level with an unlimited amount of time to roll the katamari as large as desired.  Katamari Amore is initially installed on the device with a single level known as "John's Room" that is available to play in the "Time Attack Mode", while additional levels along with the unlocking of the rest of the game modes are available through in-game purchase of level "packs".  "Eternal Mode" is only available for each level after it has been previously beaten.

The game features specific achievements attainable by players, that integrate with leaderboards on Game Center.

Development
Namco Bandai Games had submitted a trademark application to the European Union's Office for Harmonization in the Internal Market for the name Katamari Amore in 2011. At the time, it was rumored that Namco Bandai would be releasing a new game for the Katamari Damacy series, but any other details were unknown to the general public. In June 9, Namco Bandai officially announced the development of the game at E3 2011.  On that day, Namco Bandai showcased a demo of the game on the E3 show floor that featured a playable first level and the Pac-Man-themed level.

Katamari Amore was released on September 29, 2011. The game premiered with seven total levels that were available to purchase in a single set from within the game known as the "Have a Nice Trip!" Pack.

After the game's release, on October 27, 2011, Namco Bandai released seven additional levels for the game purchasable in a set known as the "Time Trip" Pack.

Reception

Katamari Amore was met with mixed reviews. Andrew Hayward of GamesRadar claimed that despite the game's great performance on the iPad, it suffered in its controls. Chris Schilling of Pocket Gamer wrote that "it creates a poor first impression thanks to Namco’s apparent misunderstanding of the freemium pricing model. All you get for your initial investment of zero pence is a two-minute time attack of one level".

References

External links

Katamari
2011 video games
IOS games
IOS-only games
Namco games
Puzzle video games
Video games developed in Japan